False fennel is a common name for several flowering plants and may refer to:

Eupatorium leptophyllum, native to the southeastern United States
Ridolfia segetum, native to the Mediterranean region